Satterley Property Group is an Australian privately owned real estate land development company based in Perth. It develops residential estates in Western Australia and Victoria.

History
The company is based in Perth, Western Australia. The company was founded by Nigel Satterley in 1980. Satterley began his career working for James McCusker, the founder of Town and Country Building Society, which led him to found Statesman Homes. This led to the current Satterley Property Group which is a major land developer in Western Australia and Victoria.

References

External links
Satterley Property Group official website

Real estate companies of Australia
Companies based in Perth, Western Australia